Cross Game is a romantic comedy sports manga series written and illustrated by Mitsuru Adachi and published by Shogakukan. It was serialized in the shōnen manga magazine Weekly Shōnen Sunday from 11 May 2005 (issue 22/23 2005) through 17 February 2010 (issue 12 2010). The individual chapters have been collected into 17 tankōbon volumes, the first of which was released on 2 September 2005, the last on 16 April 2010. A special edition of volume 17 was also released with a 72-page All Color Works: Cross Game mini art book containing all the full-color pages from the original run in Shōnen Sunday as well as the tankōbon cover images.

The series is about the high school baseball players Ko Kitamura and Aoba Tsukishima and their attempts to fulfill the dream of Aoba's dead sister, Wakaba, of seeing them play in the national championship tournament in Koshien. In 2009, it received the Shogakukan Manga Award for shōnen manga.

The series is divided into multiple parts. Part 1, "The Season of Wakaba", consists solely of volume one, and takes place while the main characters are in elementary school. Part 2, "The Season of Aoba", consists of volumes two through fourteen. It begins four years later with Ko in his third year of junior high school and continues into high school. In Part 2, the chapter numbering begins again from one. In October 2008, the series went on hiatus at the end of Part 2 and was resumed in March 2009 with Part 3, which is untitled, beginning with Ko in the summer of his third year of high school.

The series was adapted into a 50-episode anime television series that began airing on the TV Tokyo network on 5 April 2009. The manga is licensed in France by Editions Tonkam, in Italy by Flashbook Editore, in South Korea by Daiwon C.I., in Hong Kong by Jonesky, in Taiwan by Chingwin Publishing Group, in Indonesia by Elex Media Komputindo, and in Thailand by Vibulkij Publishing. Viz Media has licensed the series in North America, with the first volume released on 12 October 2010.


Chapters and volumes 
Note: This list uses the chapter titles from Viz Media's English adaptation up to volume 5, literal translations thereafter.

See also 

 List of Cross Game characters
 List of Cross Game episodes

Notes

References 

Cross Game